Kazarino is a rural locality (a village) in Gorodetskoye Rural Settlement, Kichmengsko-Gorodetsky District, Vologda Oblast, Russia. The population was 37 as of 2002.

Geography 
Kazarino is located 60 km northwest of Kichmengsky Gorodok (the district's administrative centre) by road. Svetitsa is the nearest rural locality.

References 

Rural localities in Kichmengsko-Gorodetsky District